The following list is the list of mayors of Adana, Turkey, after the proclamation of Turkish republic.,

References

Adana
History of Adana